Eduard Gans (March 22, 1797 – May 5, 1839) was a German jurist.

Biography
Gans was born in Berlin to prosperous Jewish parents.  He studied law first at the Friedrich Wilhelm University, Berlin, then at Göttingen, and finally at Heidelberg, where he attended G. W. F. Hegel's lectures, and became thoroughly imbued with the principles of Hegel's philosophy. In 1820, after taking his doctor's degree, he returned to Berlin as a lecturer. In 1825 he converted to the Evangelical Church in Prussia, and the following year was appointed extraordinary, and in 1828 ordinary, professor in the Berlin University faculty of law. Before converting, he was a member of the Society for the Culture and Science of the Jews, alongside Joel Abraham List, Isaac Marcus Jost and Leopold Zunz.

At this period the historical school of jurisprudence was coming to the front, and Gans, his Hegelian tendencies predisposing him to treat law historically, applied the method to one special branch—the right of succession. His great work, Erbrecht in weltgeschichtlicher Entwicklung (1824, 1825, 1829 and 1835), is of enduring value, not only for its extensive survey of facts, but for the admirable manner in which the general theory of the slow evolution of legal principles is presented.

In 1830, and again in 1835, Gans visited Paris, and formed an intimate acquaintance with the leaders of literary culture and criticism there. The liberality of his views, especially on political matters, drew upon Gans the displeasure of the Prussian government, and his course of lectures on the history of the last fifty years (published as Vorlesungen über die Geschichte der letzten fünfzig Jahre, Leipzig, 1833-1834) was prohibited. He died in Berlin.

Other works are a treatise on the fundamental laws of property (Über die Grundlage des Besitzes, Berlin, 1829), a portion of a systematic work on the Roman civil law (System des römischen Zivilrechts, 1827), and a collection of his miscellaneous writings (Vermischte Schriften. 1832). Gans edited the Philosophie der Geschichte in Hegel's Werke, and contributed a preface. He also wrote Das Erbrecht in Weltgeschichtlicher Entwickelung (4 vols., 1834) which was translated into French.

References 
 Eduard Gans on Encyclopædia Britannica
 Johann Braun: Judentum, Jurisprudenz und Philosophie. Bilder aus dem Leben des Juristen Eduard Gans (1797–1839). Nomos, Baden-Baden 1997,  
 
 
  

Converts to Protestantism from Judaism
German Protestants
18th-century German Jews
Jurists from Berlin
1797 births
1839 deaths
Academic staff of the Humboldt University of Berlin
Hegelian philosophers
19th-century German philosophers
19th-century German jurists